The 2000 Men's Floorball Championships were the third men's Floorball World Championships. It was held in May 2000 in Norway, and won by Sweden.

Championship results

Preliminary round

Group A

Group B

Placement round

7th place match

5th place match

Playoffs

Semi-finals

Bronze medal match

Championship match

Leading scorers

Awards & All-Star Team
Goalkeeper:  Morten Andersen
Defense:     Vesa Punkari,  Johan Davidsson
Forward:     Tero Karppanen,  Mika Kohonen,  Martin Olofsson
Most Valuable Player (MVP):  Martin Olofsson

Ranking

Official 2000 A-Division Rankings according to the IFF

External links 
Tournament Statistics
Official Website

Floorball Championships
Mens World Floorball Championships, 2000
Floorball World Championships
Floorball in Norway
Sport in Sarpsborg
2000s in Oslo
Men's World Floorball Championships
Sport in Drammen